Bertholdia schausiana is a moth of the family Erebidae. It was described by Harrison Gray Dyar Jr. in 1898. It is found in Mexico and Costa Rica.

References

Phaegopterina
Moths described in 1898